This is a list of people who have served as the Lord Lieutenant of Kilkenny.

There were lieutenants of counties in Ireland until the reign of James II, when they were renamed governors. The office of Lord Lieutenant was recreated on 23 August 1831.

Governors

James Butler, 2nd Duke of Ormond -1715 (attainted 1715)
Christopher Wandesford, 2nd Viscount Castlecomer 1715–1719
William Ponsonby, 2nd Earl of Bessborough
Walter Butler, 1st Marquess of Ormonde –1820
James Butler, 1st Marquess of Ormonde –1831

Lord Lieutenants
James Butler, 1st Marquess of Ormonde 7 October 1831 – 18 May 1838
John Ponsonby, 4th Earl of Bessborough November 1838 – 16 May 1847
William Frederick Fownes Tighe 25 June 1847 – 11 June 1878
James Butler, 3rd Marquess of Ormonde 5 October 1878 – 26 October 1919
Hamilton Cuffe, 5th Earl of Desart 23 June 1920 – 1922

References

Kilkenny
History of County Kilkenny